Razan Taha (born December 29, 1991) is a Jordanian swimmer, who specialized in sprint freestyle events. She represented her nation Jordan at the 2008 Summer Olympics, placing herself among the top 70 swimmers in the 50 m freestyle.

At age sixteen, Taha became one of the youngest swimmers to mark their debut for the 2008 Summer Olympics in Beijing, competing in the women's 50 m freestyle. She raced to fourth in heat five with a time of 27.82, just a close, hundredth-second margin (0.010 behind top three finisher Dalia Tórrez Zamora of Nicaragua. Taha, however, failed to advance into the semi-finals, as she placed fifty-sixth overall out of ninety-two swimmers in the prelims.

References

External links
NBC 2008 Olympics profile

Jordanian female swimmers
Living people
Olympic swimmers of Jordan
Swimmers at the 2008 Summer Olympics
Jordanian female freestyle swimmers
Sportspeople from Amman
1991 births